The Sisaony is a smaller river in Analamanga, Madagascar. It drains the districts of Antananarivo Atsimondrano and Andramasina, in the central Highlands of Madagascar into the Ikopa River.  Via the Betsiboka River its waters reach the Indian Ocean.

Waterfalls
At the entry of Andramasina there is a fall of 30-40m.

References
Mise en oeuvre d’un modèle hydrologique conceptuel sur le bassin versant de la Sisaony, Région Analamanga, Madagascar
Valorisation de la ressource en eau : Cas de la rivière Sisaony à Andramasina

External links

Rivers of Madagascar
Rivers of Analamanga